Pandiborellius magrettii is a species of scorpion native to Africa.

Description

Body and tail are dark brown, with  dark olive-brown at the sides of the cephalothorax. The large pincers are dark brown. Legs, known as the metasomaa, are yellowish. Dorsal keels on fourth metasomal segments lack discrete denticles.

Distribution
This species is native to Eritrea, Ethiopia, Somalia and Sudan.

References
 Biolib
 František KOVAŘÍK   Scorpions of Djibouti, Eritrea, Ethiopia, and Somalia (Arachnida: Scorpiones), with a key and descriptions of three new species
 Archive.org

External links

Scorpionidae
Scorpions of Africa
Animals described in 1901